The 25th National Film Awards, presented by Directorate of Film Festivals, the organisation set up by Ministry of Information and Broadcasting, India to felicitate the best of Indian Cinema released in the year 1977. Ceremony took place on 27 April 1978.

Juries 

Two different committees were formed for feature films and short films, headed by Ebrahim Alkazi and Ashok Mitra respectively.

 Jury Members: Feature Films
 Ebrahim Alkazi (Chairperson)Thakazhi Sivasankara PillaiAdya RangacharyaKa. Naa. SubramanyamSundari K. Shridharani
 Firoze RangoonwallaRita Ray (Kobita Sarkar)N. S. RamachandranK. M. AlmadiK. S. DuggalRaghuveer Chaudhari
 Allauddin KhanSwapan MullickA. ViswamR. D. MathurM. K. Raina
 Jury Members: Short Films
 Ashok Mitra (Chairperson)M. N. KapurKapila VatsyayanR. N. Pande

Awards 

Awards were divided into feature films and non-feature films.

Lifetime Achievement Award

Feature films 

Feature films were awarded at All India as well as regional level. For 25th National Film Awards, a Kannada film, Ghatashraddha won the President's Gold Medal for the All India Best Feature Film also winning the maximum number of awards (three). Following were the awards given in each category:

All India Award 

Following were the awards given:

Regional Award 

The awards were given to the best films made in the regional languages of India. For feature films in Bengali, English, Hindi, Kashmiri, Meitei and Punjabi, award for Best Feature Film was not given.

Non-Feature films 

Following were the awards given:

Short films

Awards not given 

Following were the awards not given as no film was found to be suitable for the award:

 Second Best Feature Film
 Best Story
 Best Feature Film on National Integration
 Best Film on Family Welfare
 Best Lyrics
 Best Film on Social Documentation
 President's Silver Medal for Best Feature Film in Bengali
 President's Silver Medal for Best Feature Film in English
 President's Silver Medal for Best Feature Film in Hindi
 President's Silver Medal for Best Feature Film in Manipuri
 President's Silver Medal for Best Feature Film in Punjabi

References

External links
 National Film Awards Archives
 Official Page for Directorate of Film Festivals, India

National Film Awards (India) ceremonies
National Film Awards
National Film Awards
National Film Awards